The Pudong Mosque is a mosque in Pudong, Shanghai, China.

History
The mosque was originally constructed in 1935 at No. 16 Wujiating, Pudong Avenue. It underwent expansion in 1984 due to its small size. In 1995, the mosque was rebuilt at its present location with the support and funding from Pudong District government.

Architecture
The mosque covers an area of 1,650 m2 which includes a courtyard, prayer hall, imam room, ablution room and office. The building has light-colored exterior with green dome. The main building consists of three floors built with Arabic style of architecture. It has a 40-meter high minaret and three smaller domes. The mosque also features shop selling books, religious materials and food.

The main prayer room can accommodate 500 worshipers with additional prayer room at the back to be opened during Friday prayer that can accommodate 300 worshiper and the female prayer room section that can accommodate 50 worshipers.

Transportation
The mosque is accessible within walking distance north of Yuanshen Stadium Station of Shanghai Metro.

See also
 Islam in China
 List of mosques in China

References

1935 establishments in China
Mosques completed in 1935
Mosques completed in 1995
Mosques in Shanghai